Alberto Coronado Quintanilla (born 3 December 1963) is a Mexican politician affiliated with the PAN. He currently serves as Deputy of the LXII Legislature of the Mexican Congress representing Nuevo León.

References

1963 births
Living people
Politicians from Monterrey
National Action Party (Mexico) politicians
21st-century Mexican politicians
Deputies of the LXII Legislature of Mexico
Members of the Chamber of Deputies (Mexico) for Nuevo León